This page lists the characters that appear in Assassination Classroom.

Main characters

Koro-sensei

 is the main protagonist and anti-hero of the series. He is a powerful octopus-like creature who is the homeroom teacher of Class 3-E of Kunugigaoka Junior High School. Koro-sensei is initially thought to be the perpetrator of the explosion of the Moon, which has rendered it permanently in a crescent shape; this is later revealed to be false, as the true culprit was a mouse implanted with his cells that had been sent to the moon as part of an experiment. Despite not having the intention to get killed, he offered to governments all over the world a chance to kill him under the condition that he is allowed to be the homeroom teacher of Class 3-E until the end of the year, when he will destroy the Earth by self-explosion unless he is killed. He is dedicated to his task as a teacher and imparting his knowledge of assassination to the students, despite knowing full well that he is their target. However, he is able to connect with each student individually, which is why all of his students respect him, despite knowing that he will destroy the planet in a year. He takes a form similar to an octopus with eight tentacles and his skin color changes depending on his mood. He is also intelligent to the point that he could teach almost every subject to all of his students single-handedly. He does however have a number of weaknesses, mainly to special rubber knives and BB pellets specifically designed to work against his body.

While he is initially believed to be an alien, he later reveals that he was once a legendary human assassin who was the original Reaper. After being betrayed by his apprentice (the Reaper seen throughout the series), he was captured and sent to a facility where a series of experiments were performed on him and transforms his body which causes him to mutate into a new form. Koro-sensei was born in the slums of an unknown third world country, where he soon learned he had a natural talent for killing and an inborn lack of empathy. He became an assassin, murdering anyone for the right price, even world leaders and the heads of entire militaries. However, after being captured and used as a guinea pig, he begins to learn compassion and empathy from a female intern with whom he becomes close. His decision to become a teacher involves his promise to the intern who thought that he was suitable to become one, later revealed to be Class 3-E's former teacher, Aguri Yukimura, who was selected to be his observer during the experiments performed on him. According to Koro-sensei, his lifespan will be over by the end of the school year in March, and if he is not killed by then, the whole planet will perish with him due to the explosive release of the anti-matter in his body that was generated by the experiments performed on him. After a vicious clash with Kōtarō Yanagisawa, the scientist responsible for his current condition, and his former apprentice, the second 'God of Death', and using all of his energy left to save one of his students who was mortally injured during the confrontation, an exhausted Koro-sensei bids farewell to his students and finally allows them to kill him, with Nagisa ultimately doing so by stabbing him in the heart. After being assassinated, his body disintegrates into multiple floating orbs of light while his clothes are left behind.

Koro-sensei appears as a playable character in the video game J-Stars Victory VS.

Nagisa Shiota
 
 Actor portrayal: Ryosuke Yamada

 is the main human protagonist of the series. He is one of the students in Class 3-E and the series' narrator. Nagisa is seen as one of the weakest students in the class due to his small stature and mediocre physical abilities that are comparable to some of the girls in the class. However, he is actually the most talented to become an assassin out of all the students, something that is acknowledged by Koro-sensei and Karasuma. He is able to draw closer while hiding his bloodlust to make a surprise attack and is able to make his opponents falter through his bloodlust alone. Nagisa usually writes down Koro-sensei's weaknesses, which at first seem minor (since they do not look like major weaknesses). However, some of them are eventually revealed to be useful as the students are almost able to kill Koro-sensei because of one of these weaknesses. Outwardly friendly and polite to his friends and everyone, he hides a somewhat darker side of him as an assassin that is not noticeable during daily life and is only revealed during training and assassination time. When engaged in battle, Nagisa becomes a brutal assassin who would throw away his life if it meant killing his target. According to Karasuma, whenever Nagisa unleashes his killing intent, he is not training and truly goes for a kill.

At home, Nagisa lives with his chronically absent father and abusive mother. His mother tries to live vicariously through him by making him follow her exact life plan for him, because she experienced a lot of failure in life and was also never allowed to look like a "pretty girl" by her parents. This causes her to constantly tell him she wishes he was born a girl and make him grow his hair long, which she only lets him tie up because if she unties, he still looks like a girl. His mother is also the foundation for his assassination talents, because whenever he tries to defy her when she is in what he perceives as a "gloomy" moment, she grabs and screams at him, so he learned to tell the difference between her "cheerful" and "gloomy" moments, in order to prevent some of her abuse.

Nagisa realizes that this is similar to the "Wavelengths of Consciousness" that the "God of Death", the world's best assassin, talks about. After this realization, he tells Koro-sensei he has the talent to be an assassin in a career planning meeting. His home life improves and his desire to be an assassin wanes after he saves his mother from an assassin, which in turn gave him time to realize his talents can be used to save people and she realized that she cannot hold onto him forever. When the time comes for Class 3-E to finally end Koro-sensei's life, Nagisa offers to deal the killing blow, which he regrettably does. During the graduation ceremony, Nagisa learns, much to his joy, that before his death, Koro-sensei talked with his father as well and helped him reconcile with his mother. During his time with Koro-sensei, Nagisa eventually realizes that he wants to be a teacher like him.

After, completing his studies, he becomes an intern at Gokuraka Private High School assigned to a dysfunctional class full of male delinquents and gang members, much to his chagrin. Nevertheless, he sets to work teaching and rehabilitating delinquent students while intimidating them into compliance with his bloodlust. In addition, Kaede implies that he will begin teaching at the old Class 3-E building in the future. He is also shown to have trimmed his long hair, although he sadly notes that he has not grown significantly taller at all since then. When Sumire Hara asks Kayano how things are between her and Nagisa, she bashfully replies that he is focused on his career at the moment.

Kaede Kayano / Akari Yukimura
 
 Actor portrayal: Maika Yamamoto

 is one of Nagisa's classmates and close friends, being the one who is mostly seen with him. She has an apparent affinity for pudding, once attempting to assassinate Koro-sensei with a giant pudding with explosives inside. She experiences a slight inferiority complex when it comes to sex appeal, especially her bust size, as she usually gets flustered towards girls with large breasts. Kaede is the smallest student in Class 3-E and is even shorter than Nagisa and Manami. She is also the student who comes up with Koro-sensei's name.

At the start of winter, she reveals her true identity to be professional method actress Akari Yukimura, the younger sister of Aguri Yukimura, the former Class 3-E teacher. Believing Koro-sensei to be her sister's killer, she stole and implanted tentacles from Shiro's facility onto the back of her neck and changed her identity in order to infiltrate Class 3-E, using her acting skills to hide her extensive blood lust from everyone until she was ready to make her move. However, using her tentacles in battle puts her life at risk, just like what happened with Itona, and before she dies, Koro-sensei manages to remove them from her body once Nagisa calms her down with a French kiss, shocking her to the point of passing out. It is also revealed that the time she spent with Koro-sensei and Class 3-E made her urge for vengeance falter over time and made her believe that there was more to Koro-sensei's past than what she had assumed. She then spends the winter break recovering at a hospital, and upon returning, decides to hide her newfound feelings for Nagisa in order to not give him trouble during their mission to assassinate Koro-sensei. During Koro-sensei's battle with Yanagisawa and the second God of Death, Kayano attempts to intervene, making use of the kinetic vision she obtained during the time she implanted the tentacles in her body, but is mortally wounded by the enemy, and to save her life, Koro-sensei performs an intricate surgery to restore her body up to the cellular level in order to save her life, a procedure he developed to ensure that the tragedy that happened with her sister would not be repeated, but exhausting himself in the process. After Koro-sensei's death, she resumes her acting career, becoming even more famous than before. When Sumire Hara asks Kayano how things are between her and Nagisa, she bashfully replies that he is focused on his career at the moment.

Karma Akabane
 
 Actor portrayal: Masaki Suda

 is one of Nagisa's closest friends and considered to be the strongest and smartest among the Class 3-E students. He is the first one to be able to inflict injuries on Koro-sensei during their first meeting. He was suspended from school prior to Koro-sensei's arrival by his class' homeroom teacher due to his extremely violent behavior. Unlike most students in the class that were relegated there due to their low grades, Karma is one of the school's most gifted students as he is the only one able to match Gakushū in terms of test results and grades, but developed a rebellious attitude due to his previous teacher's betrayal after he severely wounded a top third-year student while saving a bullied student from Class 3-E, as despite believing he has done the right thing, his teacher revealed that he was only siding with him due to his grades to increase his reputation and did not want to be held responsible for what happened. Karma then brutally beat the teacher, leading to his transfer to Class 3-E. Because of this experience, Karma originally distrusts Koro-sensei, but Karma begins to accept him after realizing Koro-sensei is unlike the other treacherous teachers at the school. After the battle to decide whether they should kill Koro-sensei or not, he grows closer to Nagisa and even begins addressing him without any honorifics. He is also one of two to tease Kaede about her feelings towards Nagisa together with Rio.

After graduation, he decides to enlist on a government test with the intent of carving his own territory in politics.

Antagonists
 
 
 Board Chairman of Kunugigaoka Junior High School and Gakushū Asano's father. Responsible for Class 3-E's current condition, he and his son share a tense competitive relationship with each other. Gakuhō's teaching skills are seemingly on par with Koro-sensei's, and he seems to know the latter's secret. He eventually takes over as the teacher of Class 3-A in order to prove their superiority over Class 3-E once and for all. Gakuhō becomes more and more desperate as finals near, and eventually uses a teaching method that induces the entire Class 3-A, with the exception of Gakushū, into a zombie-like trance that makes them sacrifice their own personal well-being for the sake of studying. These events lead Gakushū to conclude that his father is insane and must be stopped. Gakuhō eventually falls into full-blown madness after his teaching methods fail to allow Class 3-A to beat Class 3-E and several 3-A students begin to contemplate transferring to Class 3-E. It is later revealed that when he had just started the Kunugigaoka Cram School, he was a passionate, caring, and talented teacher like Koro-sensei, but changed his ideal educational system after a tragic incident where one of his first three students, an aspiring basketball player, committed suicide due to constant bullying. He believed that it was due to him not teaching his students to be strong. This belief, combined with his guilt and grief, led him to become cold and calculating, and he avenged his student by ruining the lives of the bullies by getting them addicted to gambling. After being defeated by Koro-sensei personally, he accepts defeat and has shown some changes in his personality, while still refusing to give up on his educational policy. He also reconciles with Gakushū after they both decide to sue each other and the two ultimately spend some time bonding over the filing of their individual suits and dreaming of the payouts they will get. He is apparently aware of Kayano's true identity as she was the student he demoted to Class 3-E for intentionally breaking one of his possessions when she first transferred to Kunugigaoka. After Koro-sensei's death, the Class 3-E system is abolished and Gakuhō resigns from his position on the government's orders after the public found out about his draconian teaching methods. While he is packing up his office, however, he is visited by the remaining two students from his very first class, now adults, and begins catching up with them over a bottle of wine.

 
 
 Actor portrayal: Hiroki Narimiya
 A mysterious scientist who cloaks himself in anti-sensei material, he first appears as Itona's guardian and tutor, bestowing him with the tentacles on his head and providing him the medication needed to treat it. After several failed attempts however, he abandons Itona, soon taking an interest in Kaede's potential. Once Kaede fails as well, he reveals himself as Kōtarō Yanagisawa, the lead scientist who performed the experiments that transformed the God of Death into Koro-sensei and destroyed the moon, thus making him the primary antagonist of the series. He also was Aguri's fiancé, and always mistreated her due to her low birth in comparison to his wealthy and well-connected family. He holds a grudge against Koro-sensei, who completely shattered his pride upon taking control of the experiment and winning Aguri's favor. He later returns after taking the second God of Death under his guard and modifying his body for them to enact revenge of Koro-sensei together in the final hour of the deadline before his explosion. Yanagisawa's body ends up severely damaged when he is blown away by a beam fired by Koro-sensei against the Second God of Death and comes in contact with an anti-tentacle barrier originally set up to trap Koro-sensei, leaving him in a semi-vegetative state.

 
 
 Actor portrayal: Masanobu Takashima
 A man who trained alongside Karasuma and was jealous of his abilities. He is sent to Class 3-E in order to take over their assassination training, but is forced to leave after being defeated by Nagisa, because of how sadistic his training was. He later returns, more insane than ever and he scarred his own face, he was laughed at by his peers after his defeat by Nagisa. During Class 3-E's field trip to Okinawa where he poisons more than half the class, with the only cure in his possession, he orders Nagisa and Kayano to bring Koro-sensei to him at his hotel room. Instead, Nagisa, Karasuma, and the remaining healthy students infiltrate his hotel and defeat his hired assassins, leading to a confrontation on the hotel roof. He then challenges Nagisa to a one on one fight to exact revenge for his earlier defeat, blowing up the case containing the cure to throw Nagisa into despair. However, after sustaining a beating at Takaoka's hands, Nagisa manages to stun him with Lovro's secret surefire assassination technique. Takaoka's worst fear is realized when Nagisa gives him the same innocent smile he had worn before surprising and defeating Takaoka the first time, before knocking him out with a stun baton. Takaoka stated that Nagisa's innocent smile will haunt him in his nightmares for the rest of the rest of his life. It is then revealed that the cure was unnecessary to begin with, as Takaoka's hired assassins had supplied him with a non-lethal poison, having privately agreed beforehand not to follow their employer's murderous plans. Takaoka is then taken away by the military. He was sent to jail and also was dishonorably discharged.

 
 
 The number one assassin in the world, who starts to hunt down other assassins and eventually targets Class 3-E and Koro-sensei. He initially appears as a harmless florist, but his true form is hidden behind killing intent so thick that he appears to be shrouded in darkness, leaving his true appearance a mystery. In actuality, he peeled the skin from his face so as to become a master of disguise and has heavily modified his own body to become an efficient killer, such as implanting a small caliber gun in his index finger. He eventually convinces Irina to join him and kidnaps Class 3-E to draw out Koro-sensei, but is thwarted by Taiga and Sōsuke's skill with paint and cameras, before being betrayed by Irina and defeated by Karasuma in a fistfight before being detained and put under Yanagisawa's care. He is eventually revealed to be the second God of Death, the original being Koro-sensei, his former master, whom he betrayed upon believing that he had learned all he could from him. Initially he looked up to him and even to his death, wished to be acknowledged by him and to be just like him. Unfortunately, Koro-sensei only saw him as a tool since he had yet to learn compassion and empathy. Disillusioned, he took the title of God of Death after he betrayed Koro-sensei by letting him be captured by security guards after an assassination job. Since his confinement he went under Yanagisawa's experiments to prepare him for a final confrontation with Koro-sensei in order for both to enact their revenge on him, after the scientist revealed to him that his former mentor and the teacher of Class 3-E are the one and the same. Having a much more imposing and terrifying figure than his predecessor, the enhanced Second God of Death possesses many more tentacles than Koro-sensei and is capable of moving twice as fast than him. However, even with such improvements, he ends up defeated and killed by Koro-sensei, who apologizes to his former student for not guiding him properly during their time as master and pupil before promising to start over if they meet again in the afterlife.

Supporting characters

Kunugigaoka Junior High School

Teachers
The following are teachers at Kunugigaoka Junior High School:

 
 
 Actor portrayal: Kippei Shiina
 Tadaomi Karasuma is a government worker associated with the Ministry of Defense. He first appeared announcing Koro-sensei's deal with the government and their mission to assassinate him before the end of the year. He later became the assistant teacher and P.E. instructor of class 3-E, using his lessons to train the students in assassination techniques. He is well known among militaries for his outstanding reputation and is a powerful individual, which he has proven when he easily overpowered Irina's master, who is a retired professional hit man, and even Koro-sensei himself is afraid upon seeing his capability for the first time. He is strict, but a kind man, though he keeps a distance between himself and the students due to his status as an agent and his own professionalism. He is one of a few who is perceptive enough to see Nagisa's talent as an assassin. In the epilogue, he becomes a high ranking official in Japanese Intelligence and the husband to Irina even though he still treats her quite the same as during their time as teachers.

  
 
 Actor portrayal: Kang Ji-young
 She is a professional hitwoman of Serbian origin who is hired to kill Koro-sensei by becoming a part-time foreign language teacher in Class 3-E. She uses her charm to seduce Koro-sensei, initially making him obey her commands. However, her first assassination attempt is foiled when Koro-sensei is able to suppress her three hired mercenaries attacks. This ends in her humiliation in front of all the students, and she swears revenge. She teaches the students how to seduce people from other countries, so that with this method, they can learn foreign languages, and usually punishes male students who fail to answer her questions during her lessons by kissing them until they pass out from being overwhelmed. Much to her dismay, she is nicknamed  (formally Ms. Hella-Bitch) by her students. She develops genuine feelings for Karasuma later on, and eventually starts a relationship with him, later becoming his wife and working under him for the Japanese Government as a spy.

 
 
 Actor portrayal: Mirei Kiritani
 The late former teacher of Class 3-E, she was Kaede's older sister and Yanagisawa's fiancée. Aguri first met Koro-sensei when he was still a human, tasked to watch over him during the time he was experimented on and bonded with him during their time together. When Koro-sensei broke free, Aguri attempted to calm him down, just to be killed by one of the weapons used against him. In her dying breath, Aguri asked Koro-sensei to watch over Class 3-E in her place, as she had no one else to turn to, to which he complies. She had a penchant for wearing T-shirts with goofy prints, even during the experiments on Koro-sensei.

Students
These are the students of Kunugigaoka Junior High School:

Class 3-E
Class 3-E (nicknamed E as in 'End Class') is a subdivision of the Kunugigaoka Junior High School. Class 3-E is notorious for containing a group of students with naturally low grades. Conventionally, it is composed of twenty eight students who could not either compete with the school's standard level of study, nor comply with its overly rigid code of discipline, among others who were subjected to some form of unfair punishment. Obligated to attend class in a run down school building, set in a mountain far from the rest of the school's premises, the students of Class 3-E are largely discriminated against by the rest of their peers. The students of this class are assigned the mission to assassinate their homeroom teacher, Koro-sensei, for the compensation of ¥10 billion (equivalent to $93,038,500.00 USD as of July 8, 2020, €82,420,000.00 EUR as of July 8, 2020, and £74,140,000 GBP as of July 8, 2020). Aside from such generous reward, some students have other reasons for killing Koro-sensei, which are explained through the story. As time goes on, each student finds his or her own unique killing technique and find themselves becoming more self-confident and happy, while Koro-sensei's true identity and reasons for becoming their teacher are revealed as the year progresses.

 
 
 Actor portrayal: Miku Uehara
 She is a student of Class 3-E who uses aspects of chemistry to her advantage in assassination. Manami is naive, guileless and honest; when she has hands bottles of poison over to Koro-sensei, she informs him of their intoxication, but begs him to drink them anyway. Manami admits that she is terrible with language and speech and has difficulty to communicate with others due to this. She favours math and chemical formulas because the solutions are precise and unambiguous and deems clever wordplay and analyses of complicated emotions as unnecessary. After Koro-sensei's lesson, she gradually grasps the concept that the power of language is also important, and not simply science alone. Her first friends are Kanzaki and Kayano. After graduation, she shown to work together with Takebayashi as a scientist, using her knowledge of Koro-sensei's biology to develop medical breakthroughs.

 
 
 Actor portrayal: Mio Yūki
She is a student of Class 3-E. Yukiko is diligent and ladylike, and she is popular with her classmates and the most popular girl in the class. She comes from a high-class family that is very strict and demands that she gets only good grades, has good background, and finds a good job. Last year, wanting to runaway from her lifestyle and the issues with her father, she changed her appearance and went to play in arcade games without anyone recognising her. However, because of her "playing background", she is assigned into Class 3-E. However, after listening to Koro-sensei's words, she starts to have confidence in herself for who she is. After graduating, she is seen helping Matsukata, the principal of a local cram school that Class 3-E helped out.

 
 
 Actor portrayal: Riku Ichikawa
He is one of the students and Nagisa's best friend. He used to be a baseball player in their school's baseball club until he was assigned into Class 3-E, kicking him out of the club. He dreams of becoming a professional baseball player like his idol, Arita, and emulates his techniques to improve his own performance in baseball and is shown to very dedicated to it. He also sometimes uses his baseball techniques in his attempts to kill Koro-sensei. After the baseball tournament exhibition match between the Baseball Club and Class 3-E, he becomes proper friends with Shindō, and they promise to hopefully face off again in high school, with Sugino musing to himself if Earth is still around by then. He has a crush on Kanzaki. After graduation, he manages to become a professional baseball player.

 
 
 Actor portrayal: Yuuhi Kato
 Yūma is the class president of Class 3-E. He is well-liked by his classmates and the ladies who regularly visit the café he works at. He is considered to be an "Ikemen" by his classmates, because of his good-looks and his friendly, hard-working and modest personality. He even receives love letters from the students of the main school buildings. He comes from a poor background; living with his mother, who is suffering from an illness, and a younger brother and sister. To help make ends meet he worked part-time, which is not allowed in their school, hence his demotion to Class 3-E. Due to his background, he is said to be very versatile with food, able to cook and consume goldfish. His classmates also note how he is able to look stylish, even whilst wearing bargain clothing, further boosting his "Ikemen" image. He is also shown to be a good leader, as he was able to lead the Class 3-E boys to victory against Class 3-A in the Boutaoshi. Maehara is his best friend since childhood.

 
 
 Actor portrayal: Ken Sugawara
 The biggest in Class 3-E, and leader of his own clique of rebels within it. He is an outcast who thought he could do what he desired while in Class 3-E, feeling at home with others who had no direction. This all changed with the arrival of Koro-sensei, who gave them something to strive for, and he was frustrated at being left behind. He initially does not care about the assassination, but he changes after being used and deceived by Shiro in a plot to kill Koro-sensei which nearly killed the other students of Class 3-E. He tries to atone for his past mistakes, as shown when he still joins the others' infiltration in the island arc and tells Nagisa to not tell anyone that the illness also affected him. He even uses the money from Shiro to buy an expensive Taser to hopefully help with the assassination. Later on, with his group he also heads the attempt to get Itona to let go of his tentacles. He desires to be a politician in the future, and after graduation, his tenacity catches the attention of an important politician, who takes him as his apprentice.

 
 
 Actor portrayal: Kouki Osamura
 The pervert of Class 3-E. His interests led him to be good at photography. His main assassination strategy tends to involve playing on Koro-sensei's fondness for women with large breasts, such as using pornography to lure Koro-sensei into danger, or using pornography as a bribe.

 
 
 Actor portrayal: Arai Shota
 The fastest runner of Class 3-E, even enough to be at an Olympic level. His parents were dedicated workers of the police, so they gave him the name "Justice". He does not like his name so he goes by Masayoshi, another way the kanji "Justice" can be read. However, thanks to lessons from Koro-sensei, Masayoshi comes to accept the name his parents gave him.

 
 
 Actor portrayal: Ozawa Guami
 The artist and disguise specialist of Class 3-E. His parents were ashamed of his bad grades, as well as his being, in their opinion, unnecessarily good at art, which they did not think would amount to anything for his future. When Koro-sensei replied to his doodles, he felt a sense of acknowledgement and happiness. He finds comfort in the open-mindedness of Koro-sensei and can feel at home in Class 3-E. After graduation, he becomes an artist working on a large-scale project at a museum.

 
 
 Actor portrayal: Ryunosuke Okada
 The womanizer in Class 3-E, Maehara has a carefree personality and believes in just going from one relationship to the next if it does not work out. Isogai is his best friend since childhood.

 
 
 Actor portrayal: Yoshihara Takuya
 The anime and maid cafe fan and the bomb specialist of Class 3-E. Takebayashi is mostly a quiet person. However, he seems somewhat eccentric in his behavior and stands out as the oddball in the class. He also seems to be clumsy at physical activity, having ping pong balls hit his glasses while playing with others and nearly losing balance in one of Tadaomi Karasuma's lessons. Takebayashi's family have been doctors for generations. His elder brothers are all in Tokyo University in the medical departments. As such, there is enormous pressure for him to succeed, and he is considered the outcast of the family. He is the only student who decides to leave Class 3-E for personal reasons. He was nearly deceived by Gakuhō and Gakushū upon leaving the class but he has become motivated in killing after he realized that his old classmates and Koro-sensei still look after him. He eventually returns to Class 3-E after a bold speech and destroying one of Gakuhō's possessions from his office. After graduation, he is shown to have become a scientist and is currently working with Manami to create medical breakthroughs based on Koro-sensei's biology.

 
 
 Actor portrayal: Takumi Ooka
 Chiba is a serious and stoic boy. He is very calm and business-like and does not talk a lot. Like Hayami, he has been compared to a working adult and though the two are very similar, Chiba is shown to be less stoic than Hayami. Chiba is the best marksman among the boys of Class 3-E. He excels in spatial calculation and as such is unmatched in long distance shooting. His abilities have even earned him the praises of Lovro, a hitman dealer and a retired assassin.

 
 
 Actor portrayal: Mikawa Yusae
 An aspiring movie director, Mimura edited the short film that Class 3-E used in their plan in the Island Arc, and later directed during the class play. He is secretly passionate about air guitar, which embarrasses him whenever it is brought up.

 
 
 Actor portrayal: Takao Yuji
 Noodle specialist, and part of Terasaka's gang. He is compliant with his father's bad recipe for noodles for the time being, but knows that his skills can be used to make it much better for when he takes over. One of the best chefs of the class, considering Hara his main rival. After graduation, he continues his father business, along with Yoshida, while studying management in college.

 
 
 Actor portrayal: Hasegawa titi
 Motorbike specialist, and part of Terasaka's gang. He was born and raised in the motorbike factory. He had not been able to relate with anyone else in Class 3-E about loving vehicles before, and Koro-sensei uses the "manly hobby" as a point to bond with him, but that made him break with Terasaka once. However, he rebuilds a stronger friendship with Terasaka after he changes his attitude. Childhood friend of Hara. After graduation, he also continues his father's business, along with Muramatsu, while studying management in college.

 
 
 Actor portrayal: Kanon Miyahara
 Female class representative. Megu has exceptional talent. She excels in both academics and athletics. She is the best swimmer in Class 3-E, and trains for an assassination plan involving pulling Koro-sensei into the water, but the plan fails. She is popular with other girls, evidenced by receiving love letters from them, and has the nickname "Ikemegu".

 
 
 Actor portrayal: Saki Takahashi
 Okano excels in knifework and is considered one of the two best out of all the girls in Class 3-E. Her gymnast background allows her to have unpredictable movements, and she is extremely agile. After graduation, she begins using Class 3-E's old campus and the forest surrounding it as a training ground for her university's athletic club.

 
 
 Actor portrayal: Rena Shimura
 The biologist of Class 3-E. She is so natural and simple as well as very cute that she is on very good terms with other girls and loved by the boys in Class 3-E. In the anime, it is shown that she has a crush on Karasuma. After graduation she begins using Class 3-E's old campus and surrounding mountainside as a place to take kids on nature trips.

 
 
 Actor portrayal: Seika Taketomi
 Class E's best in English. She likes to tease Nagisa due to his androgynous appearance by having him cross dress as a girl. However, she apologizes to him upon learning his family circumstances. As a child, she had darker hair but dyed it blonde upon reaching middle school. She was called a genius in primary school but because she desired to be "normal" like her classmates, she began engaging in constant horseplay to the point that she forgot to study, which caused her once high grades to plummet. She realized the importance of what she lost when she saw her parents' reaction to her low grades. She admits that she wants to be smart again but she also desires to be like her classmates and that she was able to accomplish this in Class 3-E, which she is very thankful to Koro-sensei for. However, when Nagisa proposes a plan to help Koro-sensei without the need to kill him, she objects, claiming that her bonds with him are just of an assassin and her target. After graduation, she is last seen hanging out with students at a British university in London near the Palace of Westminster which is the Parliament of the United Kingdom.

 
 
 Actor portrayal: Ayano Nichinin Takano
 Best marksman for the females of Class 3-E. She is reliable, but because her classmates depended on her too much without her complaining, she neglected her own grades and fell into Class 3-E. At the beginning of the manga and chapters set before Koro-sensei, she used to not tie her hair.

 
 
 Actor portrayal: Kaneko Umion
 The cook with a motherly personality. She wishes to become a housewife in the future. Since she has known Yoshida since she was a child, she is on good terms with Terasaka's group.

 
 
 Actor portrayal: Rena Takeda
 The manga specialist of Class 3-E. She is able to use her likes to come up with detective reasoning, and has a good investigative eye. Her excitability makes her enjoy coming up with theories, some of which may be off-mark and sound more fantastic and fictional instead. Other students usually play straight man when she breaks the fourth wall.

 
 
 Actor portrayal: Arisa Sato
 The infiltration specialist of Class 3-E. She is fairly close with Bitch-sensei and takes the most interest in the latter's stories of past experiences as well as learning the art of infiltration, negotiation, seduction. She is known for having the largest bust in Class 3-E. Her future goal is to get a job in the business sector.

 
 
 Actor portrayal: Okuma Anmi
 The only female student of Class 3-E who hangs around with Terasaka's group. She likes to be surrounded with books so her desired career is to become a librarian. Her mother is into fairytale aesthetics, which is in sharp contrast to her own daughter's dark tendencies. She enjoys creeping people out on purpose, and seems entertained by the subsequent reactions. She wrote Class 3-E's play to ruin the other classes' moods or appetites on purpose. After graduation, she is seen working at a library.

  
 
 Actor portrayal: Kanna Hashimoto
 An AI developed by Norway and sent to Class 3-E as a transfer student to dispose of Koro-sensei, able to learn his movement patterns and perfect her shooting skills in order to eventually kill him. After receiving a few modifications from Koro-sensei, she develops a conscience and becomes friends with the rest of Class 3-E, who give her a shortened nickname. Thanks to her processing power, she frequently helps with intel gathering and communications and usually interacts with others via a smartphone application developed by her classmates. After graduation, Ritsu enjoys herself traveling through cyberspace and upgrading her code, while providing aid to her former classmates when needed.

 
 
 Actor portrayal: Seishirō Katō
 The second transfer student sent to assassinate Koro-sensei. Previously known as Koro-sensei's brother (due to being implanted with the same tentacles that the former possessed), he used to possess tentacles that came out of his hair, until they were removed for his safety. He is also revealed to be a member of a family gifted with electronics. However, they were unable to compete and went bankrupt before he ran away once his father disappeared. Initially obsessed with killing Koro-sensei and prodded on by Shiro, he calms down after having his implants removed. He becomes the machinery and electronics expert for Class 3-E due to his family's expertise in electronics before going bankrupt. He hangs out with Terasaka's group as its fifth member, and after graduating high school, returns to his family's factory, hoping to restore it. When asked what will happen if he falls on hard times again, he plans on relying on Muramutsu and Yoshida to help him restart due to their university studies on management.

Class 3-A
Class 3-A is the class of top students in Kunugigaoka Junior High School.

 
 
 Son of the Board Chairman of Kunugigaoka Junior High School, Gakuhō Asano. He is the clever but arrogant leader of Class 3-A and also the school's student council president. Oblivious to Class 3-E's secret, has a strained relationship with his father, who only communicates with him in order to teach him something. He acknowledges Class 3-E as worthy rivals as he claims that they were able to bring out the best in him and his classmates because they themselves were strong. He eventually starts disapproving of the chairman's methods and intends to rebel against him going so far as to ask Class 3-E for help by having them beat Class 3-A completely and fairly during their final exams, which they do. His main rival is Karma, who is the only student on Class 3-E as gifted as him, and is eventually defeated by him in the final exams. After this, the conversation with Gakuho suggests that their relationship improved to some extent. During graduation, Gakushū renews his rivalry with Karma upon knowing that he will remain at the academy for the High School, and claims that he will eventually force him to reveal the truth behind what happened at Class 3-E during the course of the year.

 
 
 Head of the broadcasting club, specialized in media.

 
  
 The student council secretary, specialized in arts.

 
  
 Head of the biology club and expert in memorization.

 
  
 The student assembly chair, specialized in languages.

Other students
  
 Nobuta Tanaka 
 Chosuke Takada 
 Nagisa's former classmates who are constantly seen poking fun at Class 3-E.

 
 
 A student of Class 3-A and ace of the school's baseball club that Sugino was once a member of. He previously mocked Sugino's role in Class 3-E, but after being beaten by them in a baseball game, he rekindles his friendship with Sugino and helps them out during one of the exams.

 
 Portrayed by: Wakana Aoi
 A student of Class 3-B and Nagisa's old friend who exclusively appears in the live-action film.

Other characters
 
 
 A Russian assassin and the one who trained Irina. He initially comes to Kunugigaoka Junior High School to take Irina back with him, feeling she is not capable of assassinating Koro-sensei, but she manages to prove otherwise. He later returns to help train Class 3-E, teaching Nagisa a powerful technique to use against his opponents.

 
 
 Actor portrayal: Tsuyoshi Abe
 A talented sniper who is sent to Kyoto to assassinate Koro-sensei during a school trip. After several failed attempts, he gives up on his target after sharing a hot pot with him. He is later targeted and attacked by the God of Death and left for dead, but is later shown to have recovered. He is shown to have a valid hunting license for any country in the world.

 
 
 Nagisa's mother, who was rather strict with Nagisa; culminating with his insecure personality and effeminate look. After trying to burn down the Class 3-E building due to Nagisa refusing to transfer to the main campus, she relents and begins to reconsider her actions after being rescued by him from an assassin sent to kill Koro-sensei. After Koro-sensei's death, it is revealed that she reconciled with her ex-husband with help from Koro-sensei.

 
 
 A bored and rich student who met Nagisa at the resort, he initially mistook Nagisa for a girl and fell in love with "her" before the latter corrects him later on and inspiring him to be more motivated in life. He is also a renowned food critic online.

 
 
 One of the first three students in Gakuhō Asano's cram school ten years prior to the Assassination Classroom series. A promising basketball player, he eventually commits suicide due to constant bullying, darkening Asano's personality as the latter takes revenge against the bullies and becomes more ruthless until meeting Koro-sensei.

 
 
 One of the first three students in Gakuhō Asano's cram school ten years prior to the Assassination Classroom series. She was last seen meeting Asano after the latter begins to pack up upon being forced to resign from his junior high school over a bottle of wine.

 
 
 One of the first three students in Gakuhō Asano's cram school ten years prior to the Assassination Classroom series. He was last seen meeting Asano after the latter begins to pack up upon being forced to resign from his junior high school over a bottle of wine.

 
 
 The Principal of Wakaba Park Nursery School, he is injured by Class 3-E while the latter are practicing parkour. They later repay him as an apology by upgrading the daycare center he runs, babysitting the children there, and even donating a portion of the reward for killing Koro-sensei to the nursery. Seven years after Class 3-E graduates, he is last seen being helped by Kanzaki.

 
 
 A young elementary school student, she was constantly bullied at school and so went back to Wakaba Park Nursery School run by Matsukata to avoid interacting with fellow students her age. While she was initially hostile to Class 3-E, she eventually opened up to Nagisa while the latter becomes her personal tutor. He helps gives her the confidence to go back while she begins to have a crush on him. Seven years after Class 3-E graduates, she is last seen as a high school student interacting in a more confident manner with her peers.

References

Assassination Classroom
Assassination Classroom
Assassination Classroom